Chile competed at the 1994 Winter Olympics in Lillehammer, Norway.

Competitors
The following is the list of number of competitors in the Games.

Alpine skiing

Men

References

Official Olympic Reports

Nations at the 1994 Winter Olympics
1994
Winter Olympics